Ariza is a Spanish language name. It may refer to:

Places

Spain
Ariza, Zaragoza, municipality in the province of Zaragoza, Aragon, Spain
Alconchel de Ariza
Embid de Ariza
Monreal de Ariza
Pozuel de Ariza

People
Ariza (surname), includes list of people with the name
Ariza Makukula (born 1981), Portuguese footballer

Nature
Bangana ariza, or Reba, a species of cyprinid fish found in India, Nepal, Bangladesh and Pakistan
Tillandsia ariza-juliae, a species of flower

Medicine
Ariza, a former proposed brand name for the drug gepirone

Spanish-language surnames